The 1950 United States Senate election in Maryland was held on November 7, 1950. Incumbent Democratic U.S. Senator Millard Tydings ran for a fifth term in office, but was defeated by Republican John Marshall Butler.

Democratic primary

Candidates
John A. Meyer, former U.S. Representative from Baltimore
Hugh J. Monaghan II
Millard Tydings, incumbent Senator since 1927

Results

Republican primary

Candidates
John Marshall Butler, Baltimore attorney
D. John Markey, former University of Maryland football coach and candidate for Senate in 1946

Results

Although Markey received more raw votes than Butler, Butler received the highest unit vote at the State Convention and was nominated for Senate.

General election

Results

See also 
 1950 United States Senate elections

References 

Maryland
1950
United States Senate